This is a list of the number-one hit albums and singles in 1974 in Denmark. The charts were produced by the IFPI Danmark and were published in the newspaper Ekstra Bladet as well as broadcast on Danmarks Radio. The charts were compiled from album and single sales. At the end of August, Danmarks Radio stopped broadcasting the IFPI chart due to uncertainty over how it was compiled and decided to produce its own chart. Ekstra Bladet also stopped publishing the IFPI chart and began publishing the Danmarks Radio chart. The IFPI chart continued to be published in Billboard magazine's Hits of the World section; however, they were not published every week and the chart corresponded to the date two weeks before the Billboard publication date.

References

1974 in Denmark
Denmark
Lists of number-one songs in Denmark